A hypocrite is person who indulges in hypocrisy. 

Hypocrite(s) or The Hypocrite may also refer to:

Books
The Hypocrite, a 1768 play by Isaac Bickerstaff
 Ayit Tzavua or The Hypocrite, an 1858 Hebrew novel by Abraham Mapu
 The Hypocrite, a, 1898 novel by C. Ranger-Gull
The Hypocrites, a 1906 play by Henry Arthur Jones
the hypocrites, a translation of the Arabic title al-Munāfiqūn, Quranic Chapter 63

Film and TV
 Hypocrites (1915 film), directed by Lois Weber
 The Hypocrite (1922 film), directed by Oscar Micheaux
 The Hypocrites (1923 film), a 1923 British Dutch silent film directed by Charles Giblyn based on the 1906 play
 Hypocrite (film) (Spanish: Hipócrita), a 1949 Mexican film
 The Hypocrites (1965 film) (Los hipócritas), a 1965 Argentine crime film
 Die Scheinheiligen or The Hypocrites, a 2001 German film

Music
The Hypocrite, a 1995 album by Ryan Downe
"Hypocrite", a 1994 single by Lush from Split
"Hypocrite", a song by Falz from Moral Instruction 
"Hypocrites", a song by KoRn
 "Hypocrite", a song by Cage the Elephant from Melophobia

Other uses
Hypocrite Channel, a channel in Massachusetts Bay
 The Hypocrites (theatre company), a Chicago-based theatre company

See also
Hypocrisy (disambiguation)
Hippocrates (disambiguation)